The 1987 New Jersey State Senate elections were held on November 3.

The election took place mid-way through the second term of Governor Thomas Kean. The elections were marked by extreme stability; only one seat, that of Peter P. Garibaldi, did not return its incumbent Senator. Multiple Senators were re-elected unopposed.

Incumbents not running for re-election 
Every incumbent Senator ran for re-election.

Summary of results by State Senate district

District 1

District 2

District 3

District 4

District 5

District 6

District 7

District 8

District 9

District 10

District 11

District 12

District 13

District 14

District 15

District 16

District 17

District 18

District 19

District 20

District 21

District 22

District 23

District 24

District 25

District 26

District 27

District 28

District 29

District 30

District 31

District 32

District 33

District 34

District 35

District 36

District 37

District 38

District 39

District 40

References 

1987 New Jersey elections
New Jersey State Senate
New Jersey State Senate elections